The 1977 Division I NCAA Men's Lacrosse Championship game was played at University of Virginia in front of 10,080 fans. Cornell capped off a 13–0 season with its second-straight NCAA championship as they defeated Johns Hopkins, 16–8.

Tournament overview

Led for the second straight year by Coach Richard M. Moran and USILA most outstanding player winner Eamon McEneaney, Cornell completed a second undefeated season becoming the first team to win back-to-back championships. Cornell capped off a 13–0 season with a 16–8 victory over Johns Hopkins in the finals. McEneaney scored three goals and assisted on five others, while Hall of Famer Dan Mackesey was a stalwart in goal with 14 saves. Cornell opened with an 9 to 0 lead in the first 20 minutes and led by as many as 13 to 1 early in the second half of the finals.

The victory was the 29th straight for Cornell and represented their third title in seven NCAA championships. Cornell would not lose again until the following year's championship game again versus Johns Hopkins. Both of Hopkins' losses during the season were to Cornell, and McEneaney had 25 total points during the tournament eclipsing the prior record of 20 set by Mike French in 1976.

Coach Moran earned his second Morris Touchstone Award as the Division I Coach of the Year, while Eamon McEneaney won the Lt. Raymond Enners Award as the most outstanding player in the nation and Chris Kane wins the Schmeisser Cup as the nation's outstanding defenseman. Dan Mackesey repeated as the winner of the Ens. C.M. Kelly, Jr. Award as the nation's most outstanding goaltender, making it the fifth time in a 10-year span that a Big Red player had received the award.

Tournament results

Tournament boxscores

Tournament Finals

Tournament Semi-Finals

Tournament First Round

Tournament outstanding players

 Eamon McEneaney, Cornell, tournament Most Outstanding Player

Tournament notes 

 Cornell the national champion scores 55 total goals, a new tournament record

References

External links
1977 NCAA Men's Lacrosse National Championship at YouTube

NCAA Division I Men's Lacrosse Championship
NCAA Division I Men's Lacrosse Championship
NCAA Division I Men's Lacrosse Championship
NCAA Division I Men's Lacrosse Championship
NCAA Division I Men's Lacrosse Championship